Simão de Brito was the 16th Captain-major of Portuguese Ceylon. Brito was appointed in 1590 under Philip I of Portugal, he was Captain-major until 1591. He was succeeded by Pedro Homem Pereira.

References

Captain-majors of Ceilão
16th-century Portuguese people